Bealeton is a census-designated place (CDP) in Fauquier County, Virginia, United States, at the intersection of U.S. Route 17 and State Route 28. The population was 4,435 at the 2010 census.

Public schools in Bealeton include Grace Miller Elementary, Cedar Lee Middle, and Liberty High School. Bealeton is home to its own post office, with ZIP code 22712.

Geography
Bealeton is located in southwestern Fauquier County. U.S. Route 17 leads north  to Warrenton, the county seat, and southeast  to Fredericksburg. VA 28 leads northeast  to Manassas and southwest  to U.S. Routes 29 and 15, which lead an additional  to Culpeper.

The area drains south via Marsh Run to the Rappahannock River.

History
Bealeton was originally a stop on the former Orange and Alexandria Railroad (absorbed ultimately into the Southern Railway in 1894, now Norfolk Southern), and the old railroad station building can be seen in the Bealeton Station development in front of the Bealeton Library building. The building was previously located on County Road 805, Bealeton Road, which runs parallel and near the railway. The area was a major traveling point during the Civil War and saw many skirmishes related to nearby engagements.

Despite the presence of Confederate troops during the early years of the war, Union troops succeeded in pushing the Confederate line south of the Rappahannock River and eventually into Fredericksburg. This move led to the control of the Orange and Alexandria Railroad, thus allowing the Union army to transport supplies deep into southern Virginia.

Bealeton lost importance with the decline of railroad travel and became a bedroom community of Warrenton and northern Virginia primarily.  This was aided by the comprehensive plan that made authorized water and sewer availability in 1967. Bealeton retains many large farms and provides a unique blend of agriculture, commercial, and residential development.

Local attractions

Since 1970, Bealeton has been home to one of the last barnstorming air shows in America, simply called the "Flying Circus". Open every Sunday, May through October, activities include All-American barnstorming, wing walking, parachuting, aerobatic performances and open-cockpit biplane rides.

Bealeton is also the home of the world's largest old-fashioned roller skate. It was originally created as a float for a fireman's parade and put in place in front of the rink by Hugo Stribling when he opened Hugo's Skateway in 1978. The skating rink has changed hands several times since Hugo's was sold in 2007. The most recent owners closed the doors in January 2017 after their lease was terminated.

Morais Vineyards & Winery opened in 2011 and is Bealeton's only vineyard and winery, located right on Route 17. It is considered a Portuguese-style winery with a wedding venue that attracts thousands of people each year.

References

External links
Fauquier County Public Library, with a Bealeton branch
Bealeton Station Depot at Virginia.org

Census-designated places in Fauquier County, Virginia